Macclesfield Park is a 92-acre park located in Yardley, Pennsylvania, in the United States (Lower Makefield Township).

It hosts games, tournaments and practices for Pop Warner football, youth and adult soccer, baseball and softball, and teams belonging to the Pennsbury School District, primarily the soccer and Ultimate teams. Access is by permit only. The park borders the Delaware River and is accessed via River Road (Pennsylvania Route 32).

The front 60 acres of the park was dedicated in 1989.  Stephen Beede, a 13-year-old township resident, won a contest to name the park after learning through research that the Makefield name likely derived from Macclesfield in England.  The back 30 acres of the park was dedicated in 1997.

References

Parks in Bucks County, Pennsylvania